In Twelver Shia Islam, Akhbar refers to the transmitting of hadith, which are traditions regarding the actions and teachings of Muhammad, and his twelve successors. It is the foundation of Akhbari Twelver Shia Islam, which uses it to give rulings for fiqh, Islamic religious law.

External links
http://www.akhbari.org/English/index.htm

References

Shia Islam